The Jardin Botanique du Tourmalet (two hectares) is a botanical garden specializing in the flora of the Pyrenees. It is at the Pont de la Gaube on the road to the Col du Tourmalet, four kilometres from Barèges, Hautes-Pyrénées, Midi-Pyrénées, France, and open daily in the warmer months; an admission fee is charged. The garden was established in 1996 at an elevation of 1500 meters. It contains about 2500 species drawn primarily from regional flora.

See also 
 List of botanical gardens in France

References 
 Tourisme Hautes Pyrenees entry 
 Gralon.net entry 
 Je Decouvre la France entry 
 Petit Futé entry 
 Le jardin botanique du Tourmalet de Serge Rieudebat 

Tourmalet, Jardin botanique du
Tourmalet, Jardin botanique du